Ri Ri (Japanese name: 力力 ;Chinese name: 比力)  is a male giant panda born in 2006 in China and settled in Ueno Zoo of Tokyo. After the devastating earthquake and tsunami, he and his partner Shin Shin traveled from China to Tokyo in February 2011 to lift the mood of the Japanese public.

In early 2012, Ri Ri was found mating with Shin Shin. On June 12, 2017, they gave birth to Xiang Xiang. In June 2021, they gave birth to twins.

See also
 Shin Shin

References

2006 animal births
Individual giant pandas
Individual animals in Japan